The 2000–01 season was the third season in the history of Northern Spirit (now North West Sydney Spirit). It was also the third season in the National Soccer League. Northern Spirit finished 13th in their National Soccer League season.

Players

Transfers

Transfers in

Transfers out

Competitions

Overview

National Soccer League

League table

Results summary

Results by round

Matches

Notes:

Statistics

Appearances and goals
Players with no appearances not included in the list.

Clean sheets

References

North West Sydney Spirit FC seasons